The 1987 Women's Junior World Handball Championship was the sixth edition of the tournament which took place in Denmark from 23 October to 1 November 1987.

Fifteen teams competed in the competition from three continents with Nigeria being the only country to debut in the tournament. For the second time in a row, a team had to withdraw before the tournament with Argentina withdrawing to lower the number of teams to fifteen. The Soviet Union took home their fifth gold medal in the final and their third in a row after defeating host nation Denmark by nine goals in the final. East Germany finished in third after defeating South Korea.

First round

Group A

Group B

Group C

Group D

Second round

Group I

Group II

Thirteenth place

Placement matches

Eleventh place game

Ninth place game

Seventh place game

Fifth place game

Third place game

Final

Ranking
The final rankings from the 1987 edition:

References

External links 

Women's Junior World Handball
Women's Junior World Handball Championship, 1987
1987
Junior Handball
Junior Handball
Women's handball in Denmark